FCF may refer to:

Sport 
 Cape Verdean Football Federation
 Catalan Football Federation
 Colombian Football Federation
 FC Flora, a football club in Tallinn, Estonia
 FC Fredericia, a football club in Denmark
 1. FC Frankfurt, a football club in Germany
 FC Fyn, a defunct Danish football club
 Fan Controlled Football,  a professional indoor football league created in 2017

Other uses 
 Fair Consideration Framework, in Singapore
 False Creek Ferries, in Vancouver, Canada
 Family Care Foundation
 Felidae Conservation Fund
 Feline Conservation Federation
 First Commonwealth Bank
 Free cash flow
 Fremont Correctional Facility, in Colorado, United States
 Frontiersmen Camping Fellowship
 For Coloring Food, used to indicate food colors approved by FDA. See Food Coloring.
 Fairchild Channel F, a video console
 FineCut Foods, Jordan Lombard, Personal Chef